El Gordo de la Primitiva (lit. the fat one of the primitive (lottery), can be translated as the big one), commonly known as El Gordo, is one of the lotteries of the Loterías y Apuestas del Estado, the Spanish government lottery authority.

The largest prize given at the Spanish Christmas Lottery (and to a lesser extent at any other Spanish lottery), is also referred to as 'El Gordo'.

How it is played 
Tickets consist of two grids, one with numbers from 1 to 54 and the second from 0 to 9. Players have to pick five numbers in the first grid and one in the second (key number). The key number also serves as return number.

The tickets can be bought from Monday to Saturday in over eleven thousand locations in Spain and cost €1.50 per grid. 

By selecting six to eleven numbers in the first grid you can make multiple (6 to 462) bets with the same ticket.

Drawing 
Drawings are held every Sunday at 13:00 (GMT+1).

Five numbers are drawn at random from 1-54, and then another one for the key number from 0-9. Prizes are awarded to tickets whose numbers match the drawn ones. First prize is for a perfect match (5+1), second for 5+0, third for 4+1, and so on until 2+0, totaling 8 prize categories. Tickets whose key number matches the drawn key number only are entitled to a refund of the amount played. 

A ticket can hold more than one bet, but each bet cannot win more than one prize.

Prizes 
From the total amount collected T, the state keeps 45%. 10% is reserved for returns (refunds), and 45% is distributed on prizes (22% for first category, and 23% for the rest of prizes). 

For all categories, the prize is shared in equal parts among all matching tickets. 

First category has a guaranteed minimum amount of five million euros. In the case of no first category winners, 50% of the amount reserved for the first category (11% of T) is accumulated to the guaranteed (or previous) amount for the next drawing, often leading to huge bonus prizes (just for the first category). 

The amount for the rest of prizes (23% of T) is then reduced by the number of tickets with 2+0 prizes (eighth category), each of which receive a fixed amount of 3 €. The resulting amount R is then distributed like this: 
 33% of R for second category (5+0)
 6% of R for third category (4+1)
 7% of R for fourth category (4+0)
 8% of R for fifth category (3+1)
 26% of R for sixth category (3+0)
 20% of R for seventh category (2+1)

Special rules apply in case any of these categories remains void, and also in case any category were to have lower prizes than a lower one.

External links 
Full legal norms (Spanish)
Loterías y Apuestas del Estado - El Gordo de la Primitiva (Spanish)

Lotteries in Spain